Belok Kanan Jalan Terus (English: Right Turn on the Way) is an Indonesian mini series is an Indonesian television series produced by SinemArt, which premiered on March 12, 2023, until March 18, 2023, on Indosiar. This mini series is directed by Agus Elias and starting Cut Meyriska, Roger Danuarta and El Manik.

Synopsis 

The soap opera is about people who are trying to turn their lives around. The cast includes a former thug who is trying to become a local leader, an artist who is trying to become a religious leader, and a shaman who now runs a food stand.

Casts

References 

2023 Indonesian television series debuts
2020s Indonesian television series
2020s Indonesian television series debuts
Indonesian comedy television series
Indosiar original programming
2020s Indonesian television series endings
Indonesian television miniseries
2023 Indonesian television series endings